is a district located in Nara Prefecture, Japan.

As of 2003, the district has an estimated population of 80,507 and a density of 1,569.34 persons per km2. The total area is 51.30 km2.

Towns and villages 
 Ando
 Heguri
 Ikaruga
 Sangō

Districts in Nara Prefecture